

Eberhard Kinzel (18 October 1897 – 25 June 1945) was a general in the Wehrmacht of Nazi Germany during World War II who commanded several divisions. He was a recipient of the Knight's Cross of the Iron Cross.

Military career
Kinzel was with section Fremde Heere Ost, FHO or Foreign Armies East, until the spring of 1942 when he was replaced by Reinhard Gehlen. The FHO prepared situation maps of the Soviet Union, Poland, Scandinavia and the Balkans; and assembled information on potential adversaries.

Kinzel was part of the delegation that participated in the negotiations for the German surrender with Field-Marshal Montgomery at Lüneburg Heath on 4 May 1945.

Death
Kinzel, together with his girlfriend Erika von Aschoff, committed suicide on 25 June 1945.

Personal life
Kinzel was the uncle of Günther Lützow.

Awards and decorations

 Knight's Cross of the Iron Cross on 21 December 1942 as chief department GZ [Zentralabteilung—central department] with the chief of the Generalstab des Heeres [until November 1942 chief of the General Staff XXIX Armeekorps].

References

Citations

Bibliography

 
 
 

1897 births
1945 deaths
Military personnel from Berlin
German Army generals of World War II
Generals of Infantry (Wehrmacht)
German Army personnel of World War I
Prussian Army personnel
Recipients of the Order of the Cross of Liberty, 2nd Class
Recipients of the Knight's Cross of the Iron Cross
German military personnel who committed suicide
People from the Province of Brandenburg
Reichswehr personnel
Recipients of the clasp to the Iron Cross, 1st class
20th-century Freikorps personnel
Suicides in Germany